Ellie Nunn (born 1991) is an English actress. She is the daughter of director Sir Trevor Nunn and actress Imogen Stubbs.

She was educated at Homerton College, Cambridge. She has appeared in stage productions including the off-West End musical Desperate Measures at Jermyn Street Theatre by Robert Kingsland and Chris Barton and Declan Donnellan's production of Shakespeare in Love at the Noel Coward Theatre. In 2016, she was announced as Viola in Grassroots Shakespeare London's production of Twelfth Night in April 2016, as part of the global Shakespeare 400 celebrations.

References

1991 births
Living people
English film actresses
English stage actresses
English television actresses
Actresses from London
English Shakespearean actresses
20th-century English actresses
21st-century English actresses
Place of birth missing (living people)